Lorenzo Peracino (16 May 1710 - 25 December 1789) was  an Italian painter active near Novara in northern Italy.

Biography
He was born at Bosco, in what is now Cellio con Breia, to peasant parents. Lorenzo was likely educated as a boy in the town of Cellio. It is unclear where he learned painting. His first known work is a Martyrdom of St Mamante(1736) located in the parish church of Cavaglio d'Agogna. In 1747 he designs frescoes for the five chapels of the Misteri Dolorosi of the sanctuary-church of San Pietro, called the chiesa da Lopià. From 1748 to 1752: Peracino worked in Galliate. In 1754, he decorated the chapel of the Crucifix in the parish church of Cellio. In 1756, he frescoed two chapels in the parish church of Valduggia. Between 1759 and 1762, he frescoed the cupola of the sanctuary at Galliate. In 1761, he decorated the ceiling of the Presbytery and choir of the parish church of Breia, and the Chapel of the Crucifix in the Collegiata di Borgosesia, and the ceiling, spandrels, and lunettes of the Tempietto di San Clemente in the parish church of Santa Maria Assunta of Trecate. In 1778 he designs the fresco decoration for the sacristy of the Sanctuary del Varallino di Galliate.

References

1710 births
1789 deaths
18th-century Italian painters
Italian male painters
Italian Baroque painters
Painters from Piedmont
People from Cellio con Breia
18th-century Italian male artists